Donna Gould (born 10 June 1966) is an Australian former athlete and cyclist. She competed in the women's 3000 metres at the 1984 Summer Olympics and the women's individual road race at the 1988 Summer Olympics.

Gould is from McLaren Vale, SA, where she trained by running with her father past vineyards in preparation for the Los Angeles Olympics. In 1991 she was ranked in the top 10 women triathletes in Australia.

References

1966 births
Living people
Australian female cyclists
Australian female middle-distance runners
Olympic athletes of Australia
Olympic cyclists of Australia
Athletes (track and field) at the 1984 Summer Olympics
Cyclists at the 1988 Summer Olympics
Place of birth missing (living people)
20th-century Australian women
21st-century Australian women